Syed Nabeel is a Pakistani writer. His notable television plays include Half Set, Aap Ko Kia Takleef Hai, Main Aur Tum, Rookhey Naina, Tanveer Fatima BA, Chemistry, Shaadi Ka Laddu, Dil Nawaz.

Career 
Born and raised in Karachi, Nabeel graduated from Punjab University with a bachelor's degree in Commerce and obtained a Masters in Business Administration from Quaid-e-Azam University.

From 1996 to 2000 Nabeel was affiliated with Saanjh Theatre Group Islamabad as an actor. He performed internationally, participating in the Cairo International Festival for Experimental Theatre in 1997. He acted in several issue-based plays for UNDP and UNFPA, raising awareness on child sexual abuse and women empowerment. During this period he also wrote and directed several documentaries for International Development Partners, a Norway-based international non-governmental organisation, on inclusive education for children with special needs in Pakistan.

His first television appearance as actor was in 1993 and from 2003 he began to act and write for popular television channels, including PTV and NTM. He began directing in 2001 with Aap Ko Kya Takleef Hai with PTV, for which a season two is in production with Bol Entertainment. He wrote numerous independent plays and sitcoms thereafter.

He joined Indus TV in 2003, writing plays such as Hanste Baste and also Naak Main Dum with Samina Ahmed as director. In 2004 and 2005, he conducted several live shows for night-time transmissions with PTV as anchorperson. He joined Bol Entertainment in 2015 as writer-director. Among his most popular plays has been Dilnawaz, which was aired in 2017 by APlus Entertainment. A second season is under production for Dilnawaz and is planned to air in early 2019.

Filmography

References

External links 

 

Living people
Pakistani male television actors
Pakistani television directors
Pakistani television writers
Writers from Karachi
Male television writers
Year of birth missing (living people)
20th-century Pakistani male actors
21st-century Pakistani male actors
Male actors from Karachi